IDL (Interface Description Language) is a software interface description language (also referred to as  Interface Descriptor Language) created by William Wulf and John Nestor of Carnegie Mellon University and David Lamb of Queen's University, Canada.

Like other interface description languages, IDL defined interfaces in a language- and machine- independent way, allowing the specification of interfaces between components written in different languages, and possibly executing on different machines using remote procedure calls.

The Karlsruhe Ada compilation system used IDL resp. DIANA and its predecessor AIDA, and for marshalling the vanilla IDL External Representation.

BiiN's DBMS used IDL as well, and for marshalling a more compact binary IDL External Representation.

See also
 DIANA (intermediate language), an application of IDL

References
 David Alex Lamb, Sharing intermediate representations: the interface description language, Ph.D. Dissertation, Carnegie-Mellon University, Department of Computer Science, 1983
 David Alex Lamb, "IDL: sharing intermediate representations", ACM Transactions on Programming Languages and Systems 9:3:297-318 (July 1987)
 John Nestor, Joseph M. Newcomer, Paola Gianinni, and Donald Stone, IDL: The language and its Implementation, Prentice-Hall, 1990.
 Richard Snodgrass, The Interface Description Language: Definition and Use, W.H. Freeman, 1989
 J Nestor, William Allan. Wulf, David Alex Lamb, IDL, Interface Description Language, Technical Report, Carnegie-Mellon University, 1981

Notes

Specification languages